Sharktooth Mountain is a  mountain in the Stikine Ranges of the Northern Interior of British Columbia, Canada, located between the Cassiar and Dall Rivers.  It has a prominence of 1,653 m, created by the pass at the Frog Lakes between the Pitman River, a tributary of the Stikine and the Frog River, a tributary of the Kechika.

References

External links
 "Sharktooth Mountain, British Columbia" on Peakbagger

Cassiar Country
Two-thousanders of British Columbia
Stikine Ranges